Sheeba E.K (Malayalam:ഇ.കെ ഷീബ; born 20 May 1975 to E K SOOPI and K. AYISHA) is an Indian author who writes in Malayalam. She was born in Perinthalmanna, Malappuram district in Kerala state. Sheeba was educated at GHS Perinthalmanna, PTM Government College Perinthalmanna and M.E.S. KALLADI COLLEGE Mannarkkad. She took her master's degree in commerce from MES Kalladi College Mannarkkad.She is working as Senior Clerk in Department of General Education Kerala since 2001.Based upon her story, named The Survival, a short film for children has been produced by Perinthalmanna Municipality. 
.

Awards 
 Dala T V kochubava Award
 AVANEEBALA AWARD   
  ANKANAM E P SUSHAMA ENDOWMENT

Bibliography

Novels 
 Duniya
 manja nadikalude sooryan

Short Novels 
 Rithumarmarangal

Collections of short stories 
 Y2K
 Neelalohitham
  kanalezhuth 
https://web.archive.org/web/20170129102520/http://www.dcbooks.com/kanalezhuth-book-review-by-dr-jissa-jose.html

Translation works 
 Typhoon
 Saraswathi park
 The Novice
 Beyond The Veil

Memory
Azhichu kalayanavathe aa chilankakal

References

External links 
 https://archive.today/20140715122621/http://www.manoramaonline.com/advt/Festival/christmas-2013/literature/sheebaxmasstory.html
 https://web.archive.org/web/20140717011300/http://www.dcbooks.com/writers-and-activists-condemns-attack-against-dcbooks.html
 http://www.deshabhimani.com/vaarikaPDF-19-10-2014-15.html

1975 births
Living people
21st-century Indian writers